New Jersey's 33rd Legislative District is one of 40 in the state, covering the Hudson County municipalities of Hoboken, Union City, Weehawken, as well as portions of Jersey City as of the 2011 apportionment. As of the 2020 United States census, the district had a population of 249,706. At , the district has the smallest land area for a Legislative District.

Demographic characteristics
As of the 2020 United States census, the district had a population of 249,706, of whom 203,973 (81.7%) were of voting age. The racial makeup of the district was 100,428 (40.2%) White, 13,401 (5.4%) African American, 2,617 (1.0%) Native American, 44,188 (17.7%) Asian, 148 (0.1%) Pacific Islander, 53,709 (21.5%) from some other race, and 35,215 (14.1%) from two or more races. Hispanic or Latino of any race were 99,722 (39.9%) of the population.

The district had 148,524 registered voters as of December 1, 2021, of whom 48,077 (32.4%) were registered as unaffiliated, 82,315 (55.4%) were registered as Democrats, 16,326 (11.0%) were registered as Republicans, and 1,806 (1.2%) were registered to other parties.

The district is the smallest and most densely populated district in the state. The district has a majority Hispanic population, with 46% of the population being foreign born, the largest of any district. It has a relative paucity of African Americans and senior citizens.

Political representation
For the 2022–2023 session, the district is represented in the State Senate by Brian P. Stack (D, Union City) and in the General Assembly by Annette Chaparro (D, Hoboken) and Raj Mukherji (D, Jersey City).

The legislative district is entirely located within New Jersey's 8th congressional district.

District composition since 1973
The 33rd District, since its creation in 1973 along with the 40-district legislative map in the state, has always consisted of most of the municipalities in North Hudson along the Hudson River. From 1973 until 2011, it consisted of all of Hoboken, Union City, Weehawken, West New York, and Guttenberg, and a portion of Jersey City. In order to maintain a population close to one-fortieth of the state's population, wards from Jersey City were added and removed as necessary to obtain this population count.

Guttenberg and West New York, which had been in the district since 1973, were shifted to the 32nd District in 2011.

The 33rd District has been reliably Democratic for decades, with Republicans making brief inroads in the 1985 elections. Riding Governor of New Jersey Thomas Kean's wave of success in the 1985 elections, two Republicans won election, Jose Arango of West New York and Ronald Dario of Union City. The two defeated Democratic incumbents Robert Ranieri and newcomer Mario R. Hernandez

Bob Menendez was elevated to fill the Senate vacancy following the death of Christopher Jackman in January 1991. Louis Romano was then chosen to fill the vacancy in the Assembly. After Robert Menendez was elected as U.S. Representative in November 1992, Assemblymember Bernard Kenny was chosen to fill Menendez's vacancy in the New Jersey Senate. In turn, Hudson County, New Jersey Democratic Party boss Bruce Walter picked Rudy Garcia in January 1993 to fill Kenny's now-vacant spot in the Assembly.

In the June 1999 primaries, the Hudson County Democratic Party organization was looking for "new blood" and chose to give its official support to West New York mayor Albio Sires. Four-term incumbent Louis Romano ran in the Democratic primary and lost, making him the only one of the 80 incumbents in the Assembly to lose their primary bid.

Assemblymember Rafael Fraguela was knocked off the ballot in 2003 by the Hudson County Democratic Party and chose to run for the Senate as a Republican against Bernard Kenny. Fraguela insisted that the Democrats "have been putting aside all the Hispanic Democratic candidates", while "The GOP has had open arms to the Hispanic community". Caridad Rodriguez resigned from office in May 2011 after winning a seat on the West New York Board of Commissioners.

Election history
Senators and Assembly members elected from the district are as follows:

Election results

Senate

General Assembly

References

Hudson County, New Jersey
33